Sheldon Lake is a reservoir on Carpenters Bayou in the San Jacinto River basin, 16 miles (26 km) northeast of downtown Houston, Texas.  The reservoir was created in 1943 when the federal government built a dam to provide fresh water for shipbuilding and shipping industries on the Houston Ship Channel during World War II.  After the war, the management of the reservoir was assumed by the City of Houston.  In 1952, after the construction of the dam that creates Lake Houston, the city sold the reservoir to the Texas Parks and Wildlife Department for use as a waterfowl sanctuary and public fishing site.  In 1984, the land around the reservoir was designated the Sheldon State Wildlife Management Area.

Fish and plant populations

Sheldon Lake has been stocked with species of fish intended to improve the utility of the reservoir for recreational fishing.  Fish present in Sheldon Lake include catfish, largemouth bass, crappie, bluegill, and sunfish.

Recreational uses
Birdwatching and fishing are both popular recreational uses of the park. SLSP has four distinct habitats: bottomland woods; restored coastal prairie; open water and marsh of the lake; and cypress swamp. These habitats are a microcosm of those found on the Upper Texas Coast.

A five-year bird census of the park was completed in July, 2006. Nearly four dozen additional bird species were added to the park's checklist. The newly revised SLSP bird checklist features 249 bird species. Each spring over 200 bird species are possible. Texas' largest inland waterbird colony can be found on 29+ spoil islands. The nonstop sight and sounds of this colony is best viewed from along the west levee. This colony is growing and now hosts over 2,200 heron, egret, roseate spoonbill, anhinga, Neotropic cormorant and ibis nests each year. Purple gallinule and least bittern also breed on the lake. Also in spring, over 22 Neotropic migrant species are reported.

Winter is the next best birding season at SLSP. Over 160 bird species are possible here in winter. Annual winter bird counts find over 90 species of wintering birds on the park in a day. Some winter specialties include ash-throated and vermilion flycatchers, fish crow, Le Conte's and grasshopper sparrows. Also American bittern, canvasback and Ross's goose. A great kiskadee over-wintered in 2005–06.

Visit Friends of Sheldon Lake SP for an updated checklist and tips for birding SLSP.

See also
Sheldon Lake State Park and Environmental Learning Center

External links
Friends of Sheldon Lake SP
Directions and area map
Sheldon Lake - Texas Parks & Wildlife
Sheldon Lake State Park and Environmental Learning Center
 

Reservoirs in Texas
Protected areas of Harris County, Texas
Geography of Houston
Bodies of water of Harris County, Texas
1943 establishments in Texas